Donald Earl Jackson (born June 23, 1930) is a former Canadian politician, who represented the electoral district of Timiskaming in the Legislative Assembly of Ontario from 1967 to 1971. He was a member of the Ontario New Democratic Party. After winning in the general election, in 1967, Jackson served one term, losing to the PC candidate Ed Havrot. As an opposition member, Jackson served on a variety of Standing Committees, particularly those, like the Standing Committee on Natural Resources, Wildlife and Mining, with particular significance to his riding in northern Ontario. He was born in Shannonville, Ontario.

References

External links
 

Ontario New Democratic Party MPPs
People from Timiskaming District
Living people
1930 births